Sveum is a surname. Notable people with the surname include:

Bente Øyan Sveum (born 1945), Norwegian politician
Dale Sveum (born 1963), American baseball player, coach, and manager
Dennis Sveum, American ice dancer
Dennis Sveum (ice hockey) (born 1986), Norwegian ice hockey player